Devon Allen (born December 12, 1994) is an American track and field athlete, specializing in the 110-meter hurdles, and a wide receiver for the Philadelphia Eagles of the National Football League (NFL). He played wide receiver for the University of Oregon football team from 2014 to 2016. In the 110-meter hurdles, Allen is a three-time U.S. national champion (2014, 2016, and 2018) and a two-time Olympian, reaching the finals in both the 2016 Rio de Janeiro Olympics and the 2020 Tokyo Olympics. His personal best of 12.84 seconds, set in 2022, ranks as the third-fastest time in history. In his final meet of 2021, Allen clocked 12.99 seconds and became the 13th American hurdler to ever break the 13-second barrier in this event. In April 2022, the Philadelphia Eagles signed Allen as a wide receiver.

On July 17, 2022, Allen was disqualified at the 2022 World Athletic Championships in Eugene, Oregon, due to a controversial false start. The sensors in the starting blocks measured his reaction time from the moment the gun went off at 0.099 second, which is 0.001 second faster than the legally allowed reaction time of 0.1 second.

Recruiting

Achievements

Track and Field

1Disqualified in the final

Football career

College Football
Coming out of high school as a four-star recruit, Allen committed to the University of Oregon and played on their football team for three years as a wide receiver, with his first season as the most productive one. After coming out of college, however, he focused his athletics on hurdling and track-and-field rather than football. 

After years of competing in the US Nationals and the Olympics, Allen chose to participate in the football pro day held for players at the University of Oregon during the 2022 preseason. Allen caught the attention of NFL scouts when he ran an unofficial 4.35-second 40-yard dash. He impressed the Eagles enough to merit a visit on April 7 to their training facility, the NovaCare Complex.

College statistics

Philadelphia Eagles
On April 8, 2022, the day after being brought to their training facility, Allen signed a standard three-year undrafted rookie deal with the Philadelphia Eagles. He was waived on August 30, 2022 and signed to the practice squad the next day.

References

External links
 
 
 
 
 
 
 Devon Allen at the Oregon Ducks

1994 births
Living people
Track and field athletes from Phoenix, Arizona
Players of American football from Phoenix, Arizona
Oregon Ducks football players
Oregon Ducks men's track and field athletes
American football wide receivers
American male hurdlers
Athletes (track and field) at the 2016 Summer Olympics
Olympic track and field athletes of the United States
World Athletics Championships athletes for the United States
USA Outdoor Track and Field Championships winners
USA Indoor Track and Field Championships winners
Athletes (track and field) at the 2020 Summer Olympics
Diamond League winners